Joe Nesci (born August 24, 1956) is the former head men's basketball coach at New York University. He retired after the 2017–18 season after 30 seasons leading the Violets.

References

External links
NYU coaching bio

1956 births
Living people
Brooklyn College alumni
College men's basketball head coaches in the United States
High school basketball coaches in the United States
NYU Violets men's basketball coaches
Sportspeople from Brooklyn